The North Sea flood of 1962 was a natural disaster affecting mainly the coastal regions of West Germany and in particular the city of Hamburg in the night from 16 February to 17 February 1962. In total, the homes of about 60,000 people were destroyed, and the death toll amounted to 315 in Hamburg. The extratropical cyclone responsible for the flooding had previously crossed the United Kingdom as the Great Sheffield Gale, devastating the city of Sheffield and killing nine people.

Causes

The flood was caused by the Vincinette low-pressure system, better known as the Great Sheffield Gale, approaching the German Bight from the southern Polar Sea. A European windstorm with peak wind speeds of 200 km/h pushed water into the German Bight, leading to a water surge the dykes could not withstand. Breaches along the coast and the rivers Elbe and Weser led to widespread flooding of huge areas. In Hamburg, on the river Elbe, but a full 100 km away from the coast, the residential areas of Wilhelmsburg were the most affected. 

On Thursday 15 February, German authorities published the first storm warning for the North Sea with wind speeds up to 9 Beaufort.
A severe storm warning followed the next day, with a predicted gauge of 3 metres above normal, which was a level the dykes could withstand.

The severe storm and the flood it caused in the last hours of 16 February affected the dykes more than predicted and led to some 50 breaches before officials raised the alarm for Hamburg.
At this time of the day, most city offices were closed, which slowed the notification of the population. Civil protection plans were not implemented yet.

Due to telephone landline breakdowns, warnings could not be forwarded from coastal to inland emergency offices. Breakdowns in alarm siren lines and electricity lines severely affected the warning system. Radio amateurs had to establish emergency operations to support emergency services as a means of communication.

Around midnight, the peaks were too high for some dykes to withstand. The backs of the dykes were not fortified, so the first overtopping waters destroyed the dykes from behind and cleared the way for the flood.

Helmut Schmidt, police senator of Hamburg, coordinated the rescue operations, and requested for emergency help throughout Europe. He requested parts of the Bundeswehr for emergency purposes, especially engineers. That meant overstepping his legal authority, ignoring the German constitution's prohibition on using the army for "internal affairs" - a clause excluding disasters was not added until 1968. Also he got help by helicopters from other NATO states. The latter were called Fliegende Engel (Flying Angels) by the people.

120 square kilometres or a sixth of the city of Hamburg were flooded, destroying 6,000 buildings. Streets were unusable and railway operation was suspended, leaving Hamburg unsupplied for an indeterminate period of time.

Aftermath
Greece donated 500 tonnes of raisins to the people of Hamburg after the flood. Afterwards, emergency plans were implemented, and dykes were shortened and strengthened, leaving some river arms and bays unattached from the sea.

See also 
 History of Hamburg
 North Sea flood of 1953
 Storm tides of the North Sea
 List of floods in Europe
 List of deadliest floods

References

Further reading

 Lamb, H.H. and Frydendahl, Knud (1991). Historic Storms of the North Sea, British Isles and Northwest Europe. Cambridge University Press. 
 Sönnichsen, Uwe, Staritz, Hans-Werner: Trutz, blanke Hans – Bilddokumentation der Flutkatastrophen 1962 und 1976 in Schleswig-Holstein und Hamburg, Husum Druck- und Verlagsgesellschaft, Husum 1978,  (in German)
 Schuller, Alexander: "Sturmflut über Hamburg. Die Nacht, in der eine Stadt ertrank – Ein Tatsachenroman", .
 Heßler, Martina, Kehrt, Christian (Hrsg.): Die Hamburger Sturmflut von 1962. Risikobewusstsein und Katastrophenschutz aus zeit-, technik- und umweltgeschichtlicher Perspektive (= Umwelt und Gesellschaft. Bd. 11). Vandenhoeck & Ruprecht, Göttingen u.a. 2014, .
 Carstensen, Holger (Hrsg.): Schwarze Landschaft nach Sturm. Der Hamburger Künstler Arnold Fiedler erlebt die Hamburger Sturmflut von 1962. Verlag Cord Oltmanns, Hamburg 2011, .
 Carstensen, Holger: Schwarze Landschaft nach Sturm. Arnold Fiedler erlebt die Hamburger Sturmflut von 1962 Verlag Cord Oltmanns, Hamburg 2011, .
 Schäfer, Katrin: „Davongekommen“ Die Sturmflut an der schleswig-holsteinischen Westküste. Husum Verlag, Husum 2012, .

Storm tides of the North Sea
1960s in Hamburg
Floods in Germany
Floods in the Netherlands
Floods in the United Kingdom
Floods in Europe
1962 in Germany
1962 natural disasters
European windstorms
February 1962 events in Europe
1962 floods in Europe
1962 disasters in Germany